Live In Japan is a live album from Simian Mobile Disco. It was released on 7 July 2008 on Wichita Recordings and Hostess records in Japan.

Although the album is made one only track, the track listing given inside the CD case shows only Simian Mobile Disco tracks, except for Ladyflash which was originally composed by The Go! Team and remixed by Simian Mobile Disco for the single release of the track and live purposes.

Track listing
 "Sleep Deprivation"
 "Animal House"
 "Ladyflash" (Simian Mobile Disco's remix of The Go! Team song)
 "It's the Beat"
 "System"
 "Hustler"
 "Tits and Acid"
 "Scott"

References

Simian Mobile Disco albums
Albums produced by James Ford (musician)
2008 live albums